The 2001–02 Serie A season was the 68th season of the Serie A, the top level of ice hockey in Italy. Eight teams participated in the league, and the HC Milano Vipers won the championship by defeating HC Alleghe in the final.

Regular season

Playoffs

Quarterfinals 
 HC Bozen - HC Meran 2:0 (2:1, 3:1)
 WSV Sterzing Broncos - HC Milano Vipers 0:2 (0:3, 2:6)

Semifinals 
 HC Alleghe - HC Bozen 3:2 (3:2, 3:0, 1:4, 1:4, 3:0)
 Asiago Hockey - HC Milano Vipers 1:3 (4:3 SO, 1:2, 0:3, 2:3 SO)

Final 
 HC Alleghe - HC Milano Vipers 0:4 (1:2, 1:4, 3:5, 1:6)

External links
 Season on hockeyarchives.info

Serie A (ice hockey) seasons
Italy
2001–02 in Italian ice hockey